Endo-1,3-beta-xylanase (xylanase, endo-1,3-beta-xylosidase, 1,3-beta-xylanase, 1,3-xylanase, beta-1,3-xylanase, endo-beta-1,3-xylanase, 1,3-beta-D-xylan xylanohydrolase, xylan endo-1,3-beta-xylosidase) is an enzyme with systematic name 3-beta-D-xylan xylanohydrolase. This enzyme catalyses the following chemical reaction

 Random endohydrolysis of (1->3)-beta-D-glycosidic linkages in (1->3)-beta-D-xylans

This enzyme is found mostly in marine bacteria.

References

External links 

EC 3.2.1